The C-14 is a highway in Catalonia, Spain from La Seu d'Urgell to Salou through Reus.

Nowadays is a highway from Salou to Reus and in the future the rest of the C-14 road will be upgraded to a highway. The N-145 from La Seu d'Urgell to Andorra will be added to C-14 too.

References

C-14
C-14